The Bandeira Waterfall is a tall waterfall in the municipality of Ermera, East Timor. It forms part of a minor tributary of the Loes River.

Geography
The waterfall is located just to the east of the –Atsabe road near Atsabe in the Ermera municipality. The tallest waterfall in East Timor, it has been described as "é de registar", and as "... an impressive sight in the wet season."

At the waterfall, the Bandeira River flows over a vertical cliff.

Economy
The waterfall has been identified as having geotourism potential, and the river as being a hydrological resource with tourism potential.

See also
 Berloi Waterfall

References

External links

Ermera Municipality
Waterfalls of East Timor